Fibre Channel over IP (FCIP or FC/IP, also known as Fibre Channel tunneling or storage tunneling) is an Internet Protocol (IP) created by the Internet Engineering Task Force (IETF) for storage technology.

An FCIP entity functions to encapsulate Fibre Channel frames and forward them over an IP network. FCIP entities are peers that communicate using TCP/IP.

FCIP technology overcomes the distance limitations of native Fibre Channel, enabling geographically distributed storage area networks to be connected using existing IP infrastructure, while keeping fabric services intact. The Fibre Channel Fabric and its devices remain unaware of the presence of the IP Network.

Similar protocols
A competing technology to FCIP is known as iFCP.  It uses routing instead of tunneling to enable connectivity of Fibre Channel networks over IP.

See also
 IP over Fibre Channel (IPFC)
 Internet Fibre Channel Protocol (iFCP)
 Internet SCSI (iSCSI)
 Fibre Channel over Ethernet

References

Internet protocols
Fibre Channel